

Sovereign states

A
 Andorra – Principality of Andorra
 Ankole – Kingdom of Ankole
Annam – Empire of Annam
Anziku – Anziku Kingdom (to 1875)
 – Argentine Republic
 Aro – Aro Confederacy
 – Asante Union
 – Austro-Hungarian Empire
Afghanistan – Emirate of Afghanistan

B
 – Grand Duchy of Baden (to January 18, 1871)
Baguirmi – Kingdom of Baguirmi
Baol – Kingdom of Baol
 – Kingdom of Bavaria (to January 18, 1871)
 – Kingdom of Belgium
 – Benin Empire
Bhutan – Kingdom of Bhutan
 – Republic of Bolivia
 Bora Bora – Kingdom of Bora Bora
Bornu – Bornu Empire
 – Empire of Brazil
 – Sultanate of Brunei
 Buganda – Kingdom of Buganda
 Bulgaria – Principality of Bulgaria (from 1878)
 Bukhara – Emirate of Bukhara (to 1873)
 Bunyoro – Kingdom of Bunyoro-Kitara
 Burma – Kingdom of Burma
Burundi – Kingdom of Burundi

C
 – Dominion of Canada
Cayor – Kingdom of Cayor (to 1879)
 – Republic of Chile
 – Great Qing Empire
 Colombia – United States of Colombia
Cook Islands  Rarotonga
 – Republic of Costa Rica

D
Dahomey – Kingdom of Dahomey
 – Kingdom of Denmark
 – Dominican Republic

E
 – Republic of Ecuador
 – El Salvador
 – Ethiopian Empire

F
Fante – Fante Confederacy (to 1874)
Fiji – Kingdom of Fiji (to October 10, 1874)
 France
Empire of the French (to September 4, 1870)
French Republic (from September 4, 1870)
Futa Jallon – Imamate of Futa Jallon
Futa Toro – Imamate of Futa Toro

G
Garo – Kingdom of Garo
Gera – Kingdom of Gera
 – German Empire (from January 18, 1871)
Gomma – Kingdom of Gomma
 Greece – Kingdom of Greece
 →  Guatemala – Republic of Guatemala
Gumma – Kingdom of Gumma

H
 Ha'il – Emirate of Ha'il
 – Republic of Haiti
 – Kingdom of Hawaii
 Hesse-Darmstadt – Grand Duchy of Hesse and by Rhine (to January 18, 1871)
 – Republic of Honduras
 Huahine – Kingdom of Huahine

I
 Italy – Kingdom of Italy

J
Janjero – Kingdom of Janjero
 – Empire of Japan
Jimma – Kingdom of Jimma
 Johor – Sultanate of Johor
 – Jolof Kingdom

K
Kabulistan – Kingdom of Kabul (to October 12, 1879)
Kaffa – Kingdom of Kaffa
 Kashgaria – Kingdom of Kashgaria (to December 28, 1877)
Kénédougou – Kénédougou Kingdom
Khasso – Kingdom of Khasso
 Khiva – Khanate of Khiva (to August 12, 1873)
Kokand – Khanate of Kokand (to February 19, 1876)
Kong – Kong Empire
 Kongo – Kingdom of Kongo
 Korea – Kingdom of Joseon
Koya Temne – Kingdom of Koya

L
 – Republic of Liberia
 – Principality of Liechtenstein
Limmu-Ennarea – Kingdom of Limmu-Ennarea
Loango – Kingdom of Loango
Luba – Luba Empire
Lunda – Lunda Empire
 – Grand Duchy of Luxembourg

M
 Maldives – Sultanate of Maldives
Manipur – Kingdom of Manipur
Matabeleland – Matabele Kingdom
 – United Mexican States
 – Principality of Monaco
 – Principality of Montenegro
 – Sultanate of Morocco
 Muscat and Oman – Sultanate of Muscat and Oman (to 1870 and from January 30, 1871)

N
 Negeri Sembilan – Negeri Sembilan
 Nepal – Kingdom of Nepal
 – Kingdom of The Netherlands
 →  Nicaragua – Republic of Nicaragua
 North German Confederation – North German Confederation (to January 18, 1871)
 Norway – Kingdom of Norway (in personal union with Sweden)

O
 Oman – Imamate of Oman (from 1870 [renamed Muscat and Oman on January 30, 1871])

 – Sublime Ottoman State
Ouaddai – Ouaddai Empire
Oyo – Oyo Empire

P
 Pahang – Sultanate of Pahang
 – States of the Church (to September 20, 1870)
 – Republic of Paraguay
 Perak – Sultanate of Perak (to January 20, 1874)
 Persia – Persian Empire
 – Peruvian Republic
 Portugal – Kingdom of Portugal

R
 Raiatea – Kingdom of Raiatea
 Rapa Nui – Kingdom of Rapa Nui
 Rarotonga – Kingdom of Rarotonga
 Romania – United Principalities of Romania (from 1878)
 – Russian Empire
 Rwanda – Kingdom of Rwanda
 – Kingdom of Ryūkyū (to March 13, 1879)

S
Samoa – Kingdom of Samoa
 – Most Serene Republic of San Marino
 →  – Kingdom of Sarawak
 Selangor – Sultanate of Selangor
 Serbia – Principality of Serbia (from 1878
 – Kingdom of Siam
Sikkim – Chogyalate of Sikkim
 Sokoto – Sokoto Caliphate
South African Republic  Transvaal
 →  →  Spain
Kingdom of Spain (to February 11, 1873)
Spanish Republic (from February 11, 1873, to December 29, 1874)
Kingdom of Spain (from December 29, 1874)
 →  Sulu – Sultanate of Sulu
 – Kingdom of Sweden (in personal union with Norway)
 – Swiss Confederation

T
 Tahiti – Kingdom of Tahiti
Tonga – Kingdom of Tonga
 Toro – Toro Kingdom (to 1876)
Toucouleur – Toucouleur Empire
 →  →  – South African Republic (to April 12, 1877)
 Tunis – Beylik of Tunis (from October 25, 1871)

U
 – United Kingdom of Great Britain and Ireland
 →  – United States of America
 – Eastern Republic of Uruguay

V
 – United States of Venezuela

W
Wassoulou – Wassoulou Empire (from 1878)
Welayta – Kingdom of Welayta
 – Kingdom of Württemberg (to January 18, 1871)

Y
Yeke – Yeke Kingdom

Z
 – Sultanate of Zanzibar
Zululand – Kingdom of the Zulus (to July 4, 1879)

Non-sovereign territories

United Kingdom
 →  – Cape of Good Hope

States claiming sovereignty
 Aceh – Sultanate of Aceh
 Cuba – Republic of Cuba
Goust – Republic of Goust
 Lado – Lado District
 Mindanao – Sultanate of Maguindanao
 Paris – Paris Commune 
 Tavolara – Kingdom of Tavolara

1870s-related lists